Zero Point One is the debut full-length studio album by progressive trance producer, remixer, and DJ Andy Moor which was released on July 6, 2012, on Armada Music.

Track listing

References

2012 debut albums
Armada Music albums